Hirsch von Pomischel (Pomyschl, Pomichal, Pomykal, Pomeiske) is the name of a noble family historically active in the Kingdom of Bohemia. Originally from the Duchy of Pomerania, branches of this family also lived in Silesia and the Kingdom of Hungary. In Pomerania, they are known as the von Pomeiske; in Silesia, as von Pomyschl. In Hungary, with its Hungarian noble predicate, as Pomichal de Réthe.

Middle Ages
The first mention of the family is in 1331, as the lords of Greater and Lesser Pomeiske in Pomerania. The family, of possibly Kashubian Slavic origin, were vassals of the Order of Teutonic Knights and were required to provide two mounted knights to this force.

The arms of the family, though original, is very similar with small modifications of other ancient uradel families of Pomerania, such as the von Ahlebeck, Carnitz, Gutzmerow, Hertzberg, Podewils, Stojentin, Tauentzien, and Wopersnow. The arms may have thus formed a clan function.

The original Pomeranian line survived until the 18th century. Its most illustrious member was Nikolaus Alexander von Pomeiske (1717 - 1785), a cavalry general under Frederick the Great, and a Knight of the Pour le Mérite Order.

Bohemia

In 1616, the brothers Paul and Isaias Hirsch von Pomischel were given permission to augment their noble arms in the nobility of Bohemia by the Emperor Rudolf II of Habsburg, in Prague. The coat of arms remains the same but the surname undergoes a Slavicisation perhaps as a result of the nationalisms of the Bohemian upper class at the time.

Isaias von Pomischel was the commandant of Reichstatt and Politz, now Děčín, between 1610 and 1614.

Gottfried (Bohumir) Leopold Hirsch von Pomischel (died 1672) was the owner of a knightly seat and estate in Markvartice (Markersdorf) in northern Bohemia. He was also known by the addition of either zu Freudenberg or auf Markersdorf. Unlike his father and uncle, he was a zealous Catholic and stayed in Bohemia after the Battle of the White Mountain. Together with Zdenko, Count Kolowrat, he was the Counter-Reformation commissar in the region. After the death of Albrecht von Wallenstein, he became the hejtman of the great castle and estate of Bělá pod Bezdězem, which Wallenstein owned. He was raised from the noble to the knightly estate (Alter Ritterstand) in 1655. A carved tombstone with the Pomischel arms of Hirsch uber Schach has survived.

His son Johan von Pomischel is also buried in Markersdorf.

References
Julius Theodor Bagmihl: Pommersches Wappenbuch. Stettin 1855, Band V

Leopold von Ledebur: Adelslexikon der preußischen Monarchie. Berlin 1856, Band II

Ernst Heinrich Kneschke: Neues allgemeines deutsches Adels-Lexicon. Leipzig 1867, Band VII

August von Doerr: Der Adel de Bohmischen Kronlander. Prag, 1900

Programm des K.K. Ober-Gymnasiums zu B-Leipa. 1878, p. 22

Jaroslaus Schaller: Topographie des Konigreich Bohmen, Funfter Theil, Leutmerischer Kreis. Wien, 1737

Anton Schimon: Der Adel von Bohmen, Mahren und Schlesien. Bohm-Leipa, 1859

Karl Freiherr von Czoernig: Mittheliungen der K. K. Central-Commission. Wien, 1888

Steven Totosy de Zepetnek: List of Historical Surnames of the Hungarian Nobility / A magyar történelmi nemesség családneveinek listája. Purdue University Press, 2010-

Bohemian noble families
Hungarian noble families
German noble families
Pomeranian nobility